is a steel roller coaster at the Tokyo Dome City Attractions amusement park, which is part of Tokyo Dome City in Tokyo, Japan. The ride was designed and constructed by Intamin.

References

External links
Official website 

Roller coasters in Japan
Roller coasters introduced in 2003